The 2006 Tashkent Open was a women's tennis tournament played on outdoor hard courts. It was the 8th edition of the event, and part of the Tier IV Series of the 2006 WTA Tour. It took place at the Tashkent Tennis Center in Tashkent, Uzbekistan, from 2 October 2 through 8 October 2006. Unseeded Sun Tiantian won the singles title and earned $22,925 first-prize money.

Finals

Singles

 Sun Tiantian defeated  Iroda Tulyaganova 6–2, 6–4
It was Sun Tiantian's only singles career title on the WTA Tour.

Doubles

 Victoria Azarenka /  Tatiana Poutchek defeated  Maria Elena Camerin /  Emmanuelle Gagliardi, walk-over

References

External links 
 ITF tournament edition details
 Tournament draws

 
Tashkent Open
Tashkent
Tashkent Open
Tashkent Open